Lavrovec is a small dispersed settlement in the hills southeast of Žiri in Slovenia. It lies in the Municipality of Logatec in the Inner Carniola region.

References

External links

Lavrovec on Geopedia

Populated places in the Municipality of Logatec